Oak Beach is a small community and census-designated place located near the eastern end of Jones Beach Island, a barrier island between the Atlantic Ocean and the Great South Bay of Long Island. The community is part of the village of Babylon in Suffolk County, New York, United States. The eastern part, the Oak Island Beach Association, is gated, whereas the western part is not. The Oak Beach CDP was first listed prior to the 2020 census. Prior to that the community was part of the Oak Beach–Captree census-designated place.

History and amenities
Oak Beach has been inhabited since at least the first decade of the twentieth century, when a U.S. Coast Guard lifesaving station was located there, although it could not be reached overland at that time.  Prior to that, marsh bird hunters had kept shacks in the area.  Ferry access from Babylon enabled cottages to be built and made more accessible by car after construction of Ocean Parkway; it was largely a summer community until the completion of the Robert Moses Causeway in 1951, which allowed much faster travel from the main part of Long Island. It has gradually evolved since then to become a location where most residents live year-round.

Although now entirely residential, Oak Beach was once the location of the popular but controversial Oak Beach Inn, which was closed in 1999 and torn down in 2003, along with a small general store ("The Store") and bait/tackle/surf shop that closed a decade earlier.  There is now a public park at the site. The "park" is unusual, in that it lacks any amenities other than a fishing dock and a single portable toilet. While the park encompasses over nine acres of land, there are but two trees and nearly 300 parking spots. In the warmer months the park - or rather the parking lot - collects an informal early Sunday morning motor rally, attracting local motorcycle and car enthusiasts.

Geography
Oak Beach is in southwestern Suffolk County, in the southeast part of the village of Babylon. The census-designated place includes the community of Oak Beach on Jones Beach Island, as well as the community of Oak Island, directly to the north. The CDP is bordered to the east by Captree State Park and to the west by Gilgo State Park. To the south is the west end of Fire Island.

Ownership
The land is not owned by the residents but is on long-term lease from the Village of Babylon.  In the early 1990s, New York State litigated against extension of the lease.  After much negotiation, including detailed environmental impact statements, the lease was renewed (currently through 2050), although with a ramp up in costs. In 2012, the Village of Babylon agreed to extend the current leases through 2065.

Shannan Gilbert
On May 1, 2010,  Shannan Gilbert disappeared after fleeing a client's house in the Oak Beach Association. In December 2010, while searching for Gilbert, the police found 10 dead bodies along the adjacent highway, some bodies in December 2010, others in April 2011. Consequently, the community attracted much public attention.

In December 2011, the body of the original missing sex worker Shannan Gilbert was found in the marsh east of the community. On November 29, 2011, the police announced their belief that one person is responsible for all 10 deaths (whom the press refers to at various times as: "the Long Island serial killer", "LISK", "the Gilgo Beach Killer", or "the Craigslist Ripper"), and that they did not believe the case of Gilbert, who went missing before the first set of bodies was found, was related. "It is clear that the area in and around Gilgo Beach has been used to discard human remains for some period of time," said Suffolk County District Attorney Thomas Spota.

On December 10, 2015, Suffolk County Police announced that the FBI had officially joined the investigation. A spokesperson for the FBI confirmed the announcement. The FBI had previously assisted in the search for victims, but was never officially part of the investigation until this announcement. The investigation is ongoing.

References

Babylon (town), New York
Beaches of Suffolk County, New York
Geography of Suffolk County, New York
Populated coastal places in New York (state)
Census-designated places in Suffolk County, New York
Census-designated places in New York (state)